Silsden A.F.C. are a football club that play in Silsden, West Yorkshire, England, and are currently members of the

History 
The club was formed in 1904. In 2004–05, they reached the second round of the FA Vase.

They are one of only three teams ever to win the West Riding County Challenge FA Cup three years on the trot – 2001, 2002 and 2003 before joining the NWCFL the following season and gaining promotion at the first attempt into the Premier Division (along with Cammell Laird).

The other two teams to have won the West Riding CFA Challenge Cup three times on the trot were  Storthes Hall (1998-2000) and Bradford Rovers (1939–41).

For the 2014–15 season; Silsden AFC fielded a Development Squad to compete in the Lancashire Galaxy League under manager Paul Evans.

Ryan Haigh was appointed first team manager for the 2015–16 season but resigned in February due to family commitments. He was replaced by former player James Gill.

Danny Forrest took over from James Gill in November 2016. His assistant is another ex-professional – Matty McNeil and is supported by goalkeeper coach Kevin Knappy, physio Andy Henson and fitness coach Clive Murgatroyd.

In January 2016 Silsden announced plans on their website to allow all Bradford City Season ticket holders half price admission for the remainder of the season. They have since extended this invitation to all professional clubs including local side Guiseley AFC.

For the 2017–18 season Silsden AFC entered an Under 21 team into the West Riding County FA U21 League.

In 2022 Danny Forrest left for local Northern Premier League side Guiseley and Luke Lavery and Matt Cavanagh were appointed as joint managers with ex-defender Shaun Airey appointed onto their coaching staff.

Current squad

Stadium
During their earlier years in the North West Counties League they played their home games at Cougar Park, home of the rugby league club Keighley Cougars. However, in early 2010 plans were put in place to upgrade their former ground in Silsden. With the help of the Football Foundation, Sports England and Asda Foundation, committee of the club, of Silsden Cricket Club and of players plus the generosity of sponsors and local businesses, their dream came true when they returned in time for the start of the 2010–11 season. Floodlights, a stand, new dugouts, coffee hut, pay-hut, walkway, perimeter fencing and barriers were all put in place to complement the newly erected £1.2 million Sports Club which houses 6 changing rooms, two referees' rooms, a physiotherapy room and a function room.

For the start of the 2012–13 season saw the name of stadium change to Angel Telecom Stadium following a five-year sponsor package with the Bradford-based telecommunications company.

For the 2016–17 season the stadium was renamed "The Cobbydale Construction Stadium" to coincide with a generous annual sponsorship deal by local builders Cobbydale Construction.

In 2016 the club again made ground improvements including new outside toilets and a new hospitality area named the '1904 Lounge' tracing the clubs routes back to its original formation.

In early 2017 the club built state of the art dug-outs to complement the completion of the exterior enclosure fencing.

2022 saw local firm Office Interiors Wholesale become the new stadium sponsor.

Records
FA Cup best performance: first qualifying round replay – 2004–05
FA Vase best performance: second round proper – 2004–05

Honours

Craven League
    
1996–97
Northern Plant Hire Cup Winners  
Division Two Runners Up
1997–98  
Division One Runners Up
1998–99
Premier Division Champions  
Premier League Cup Winners  
Northern Plant Hire Cup Winners

West Riding County Amateur League
 
1999–2000 Division Two Champions  
Division Two League Cup Winners  
2000–01 Division One Champions  
Division One League Cup Winners  
Keighley & District Challenge Cup Winners  
Division Two (reserves) League Cup Winners 
2001–02
West Riding County Cup Winners  
Keighley & District Cup Winners  
Reserve Division Two Winners  
Premier Division Runners-up   
2002–03
West Riding County Cup Winners  
Keighley & District Cup Winners  
Premier Division Champions  
Charity Shield Winners  
Premier League Cup Winners 
Keighley & District Supplementary Cup Winners

North West Counties League

2017-18
Division One winners

References

External links
Official website

Sport in the City of Bradford
Football clubs in England
Football clubs in West Yorkshire
Association football clubs established in 1904
1904 establishments in England
Craven and District Football League
West Riding County Amateur Football League
North West Counties Football League clubs
Northern Counties East Football League
Silsden